Ardmolich and Kinlochmoidart (Ceann Loch Mùideart) are settlements at the east head of Loch Moidart in the Moidart region, Highland, Scotland and are in the Scottish council area of Highland.

The Seven Men of Moidart, beech trees planted at the time of the Jacobite rising of 1745, are nearby. Only three now remain.

References

Populated places in Lochaber